This article displays the rosters for the participating teams at the 2005 FIBA Americas Championship.

Group A

Brazil

Canada

Panama

United States

Venezuela

Group B

Argentina

Dominican Republic

Mexico

Puerto Rico

Uruguay

References

External links
2005 Fiba Americas Championship for Men, FIBA.com.
FIBA Americas 2005 - Men Basketball, LatinBasket.com.

2005
squads